Jaime Gerardo Roberto Marcelino María Ortiz Lizardi (24 September 1886 – 15 July 1942) was the 19th President of Argentina from 20 February 1938 to 27 June 1942.

Ortiz is a little remembered president. He became president in 1938 following a presidential election that has been described as being among the most fraudulent in Argentine history. His main management objective was to end fraud. The attempt to normalize the institutions confronted him with his vice president, Ramón Castillo, leader of the conservative sectors of the government coalition. The president and vice president belonged to different political groupings. Ortiz was a radical antipersonnel and Castillo, a conservative in the National Democratic Party. Both were part of the formula of Concordancia, a coalition that had ruled since 1932.

Life
Ortiz was born in Buenos Aires on 24 September 1886. As a student at the University of Buenos Aires, he participated in the unsuccessful Argentine Revolution of 1905. In 1909 he graduated from the university and became a lawyer.

He became active in the Radical Civic Union and was elected to the Argentine National Congress in 1920. He served as Minister of Public Works from 1925 to 1928. He supported the Revolution of 1930 and served as Minister of the Treasury from 1936 to 1937.

Presidency
In the presidential elections of 1937, he was the official government candidate and won, though the opposition accused him of participating in fraud, as irregularities were widespread. Ortiz never denied these charges, but once he took office, he tried to make Argentine politics more open and democratic. Soon after becoming president, Ortiz became seriously ill with diabetes and on 3 July 1940, he delegated his powers to Vice President Ramón Castillo. He favored the Allies during World War II, but because of opposition within the army, he did not break relations with the Axis powers. He resigned from the presidency on 24 July 1942, three weeks before dying of bronchial pneumonia at age 55.

Honours 
 Order of Isabella the Catholic
 Order of the White Rose of Finland

See also
History of Argentina

References

External links
 

 

Presidents of Argentina
People of the Infamous Decade
1886 births
1942 deaths
Argentine Ministers of Finance
Members of the Argentine Chamber of Deputies elected in Buenos Aires
National Democratic Party (Argentina) politicians
Radical Civic Union politicians
20th-century Argentine lawyers
Lawyers from Buenos Aires
University of Buenos Aires alumni
Deaths from diabetes
20th-century Argentine politicians
Ministers of social welfare of Argentina
Order of the White Rose of Finland
Collars of the Order of Isabella the Catholic